The 1922 William & Mary Indians football team represented the College of William & Mary as an independent during the 1922 college football season. Led by Bill Ingram in his first and only season as head coach, the Indians compiled a record of 6–3.

Schedule

References

William and Mary
William & Mary Tribe football seasons
William